Women's Slalom World Cup 1989/1990

Calendar

Final point standings

In Women's Slalom World Cup 1989/90 all results count.

External links
FIS-ski.com - World Cup standings - Slalom 1990

World Cup
FIS Alpine Ski World Cup slalom women's discipline titles